Kevin Doherty is a Canadian politician, who was elected to the Legislative Assembly of Saskatchewan in the 2011 election. He represented the electoral district of Regina Northeast as a member of the Saskatchewan Party caucus.

On May 21, 2015, Doherty was appointed to the Executive Council of Saskatchewan as Minister of Finance.

He became Minister of Advanced Education August 30, 2017 but resigned exactly two months later to deal with personal issues. He subsequently resigned his seat in the legislature on March 2, 2018 to accept a position in the private sector.

Cabinet positions

References

Living people
Saskatchewan Party MLAs
Politicians from Regina, Saskatchewan
Members of the Executive Council of Saskatchewan
21st-century Canadian politicians
Finance ministers of Saskatchewan
Year of birth missing (living people)